Provincial Trunk Highways (PTH) 100 and 101, collectively known as the Perimeter Highway, form a beltway around the Canadian city of Winnipeg, Manitoba. It is often considered by local residents to be the city's unofficial boundary, although approximately three-quarters of the Perimeter Highway actually lies in the other municipalities within the Winnipeg Metropolitan Region.

Route
The beltway consists of two provincial highways connected at separate junctions with PTH 1, the Trans-Canada Highway (TCH), on the east and west sides of the Winnipeg.  The North Perimeter highway is officially designated PTH 101 and is part of Canada's National Highway System.  The South Perimeter highway is designated PTH 100 and is the official TCH bypass around Winnipeg but not part of the National Highway System.  The entire route is a four-lane divided expressway with a mixture of interchanges and at-grade intersections. After many highway authorities in Canada have moved away from the cloverleaf interchange in favour of other designs, Winnipeg has the most cloverleafs of any city in Canada, with all six being on the Perimeter Highway.

History
The highway was originally built in 1955 to bypass city centre rush hour traffic.  This was done in lieu of a more expensive freeway system within the Capital Region. The South Perimeter Highway bridge across the Red River and roadway at Pembina Highway/PTH 75 south was constructed in 1958. The job was tendered to Peter Leitch Construction Ltd. at a cost of $188,670. In December 1957, Dominion Bridge was awarded the contract ($80,157) to supply the structural steel for the overpass.  When constructed, the Perimeter Highway was located entirely in surrounding municipalities well outside of Winnipeg's official city limits, however roughly one-quarter of the highway is now inside proper city limits following the municipal amalgamation of Winnipeg in 1972.

The Perimeter Highway was originally unconnected between PTH 59 and PTH 15 as PTH 59 had received significant upgrades, making the need for a northeast section less pressing. PTH 59 continued to serve as the de facto northeast leg of the Perimeter until the mid-1990s, when PTH 59 and PTH 15 were connected. The last remaining two-lane section was the PTH 59 north interchange, which was upgraded over a three-year span ending in 2018. The highway now encircles Winnipeg as a four-lane roadway.

Improvements were made to the western segment of the highway in the early 2010s when PTH 190, Centreport Canada Way, was constructed. In addition to the interchange that connected to this new highway, a flyover was constructed over Saskatchewan Avenue (PR 425) and the adjacent railway crossing; and the median was closed at the entrance to Assiniboia Downs leaving only right-in/right-out access from the southbound side.

Shortly after the completion of the PTH 101/PTH 59 interchange, the province announced its long-term intention to upgrade the southern portion of the Perimeter Highway, PTH 100, to modern freeway standards. The first part of this plan was announced in 2018, when the Manitoba government declared an immediate three-year project to close uncontrolled access points to the Perimeter Highway, and construct several new service roads to direct vehicle traffic to controlled-access intersections. The government executed on the initial stage of this project in late 2018 by closing 12 medians and 23 left-turn accesses onto the Perimeter Highway. 

In 2020, the Manitoba government announced the first major upgrade from this plan, which would be to replace the traffic signals at St. Mary's Road with an interchange, construction for which is expected to be completed by 2024.

In parallel to the planning and upgrades to PTH 100, the government has begun planning upgrades to PTH 101. Some initial work was completed by October, 2021 in which the government closed six median crossings to reduce uncontrolled intersections on PTH 101.

On August 15, 2022, the province released an update of the projects it intended to complete, continue, or tender in 2022 for both the North and South Perimeter Highway, including the continued construction of the interchange at St. Mary's Road

Future plans
South Perimeter Highway, PTH 100:
Continued planning is underway to upgrade the South Perimeter Highway, PTH100, to a controlled-access freeway. A Design Study was completed in 2019 and the full vision for the Perimeter Highway would be realized through two multi-year phases; and some of the upgrades will potentially tie in with a new by-pass around St. Norbert.

In June 2021, the Manitoba Government announced its intention to replace the traffic signals at PTH 3 (McGillivray Blvd) in Oak Bluff with a Diamond interchange. Engineering work is projected to begin in autumn 2021. Construction will tentatively start in late 2023, after the completion of the St. Mary's Road interchange. 

On March 13, 2023, the provincial government announced their intention to construct an interchange to replace the traffic signals at the Perimeter Highway and St. Anne's Road. A timeline has not been released but it's possible that the interchange could be constructed after the completion of the interchange at the Perimeter Highway and PTH 3.

North Perimeter Highway, PTH 101:
In March 2021, the Manitoba Government introduced an intention to upgrade PTH 101 to full freeway status and released a Safety Review and a request for public engagement.

Overall:
The long-term goal is for the entire Perimeter Highway to be upgraded to a six-lane freeway. All upgrades are expected to take several decades to complete.

Exits and Crossings
Exit numbering begins at Fermor Avenue and increases clockwise.

See also
Winnipeg Metro Region

External links
Manitoba Infrastructure website

References

Expressways in Manitoba
Ring roads in Canada
Streets and squares in Winnipeg
Urban segments of the Trans-Canada Highway